Ashley August is an American actress, spoken word artist, and poet perhaps best known for such films and television series as The Punisher (TV series), The Kindergarten Teacher (2018 film), Orange Is the New Black, Dream School and Meeting Molly.

References

External links

American spoken word artists
African-American actresses
American television actresses
American film actresses
Living people
American women poets
1993 births
21st-century American poets
21st-century American actresses
African-American women musicians
21st-century African-American women